The 420 Main Building (previously known as Old National Bank Tower) was a 248-foot, 18-story office building located at 420 Main Street in downtown Evansville, Indiana. The building was the headquarters of the Old National Bank until the bank moved its headquarters to a new location in 2004. The building stood nearly vacant for the next 12 years, and was the tallest building in the city until its demolition in 2021.

History
The building was built as the new headquarters for Old National Bank, serving as a replacement for the Hotel Lincoln and ONB building built in 1916, the previous headquarters of Old National Bank. The ceremonial groundbreaking for the building site took place on December 15, 1967, and foundation work commenced in 1968. A topping out ceremony was held on May 24, 1969, and the building was completed in 1970.

In 2004, the bank moved its headquarters to the new Old National Place, located on One Main Street by the Ohio River riverfront. As a result, the building stood nearly vacant for the next 12 years. In 2015, the building went up for sale.

In 2017, local developers planned a $25 million project to renovate the building that would involve street-level retail, offices, and apartments on the upper floors of the building. However, this project was later abandoned.

In October 2019, the building was purchased by Domo Development, and plans were to redevelop the building into a mixed-use tower that would include a restaurant, retail, office, and residential space. The full renovation would have included a new glass curtain wall. The renovation cost was estimated to be $30 million.

In October 2020, Domo Development raised concerns about the cost of renovating the building and instead planned demolition. A residential mixed-use complex is being proposed as a replacement.

Closure and demolition
After years of disrepair and prohibitive costs to renovate the building, the building was demolished via implosion on the morning of November 21, 2021 at 7:00 AM, by Controlled Demolition, Inc.

References

1970 establishments in Indiana
2021 disestablishments in Indiana
Buildings and structures in Evansville, Indiana
Buildings and structures demolished by controlled implosion
Demolished buildings and structures in Indiana
Buildings and structures demolished in 2021
Office buildings completed in 1970
Former skyscrapers